UNHhhh is an American comedy web series starring drag queens Trixie Mattel and Katya Zamolodchikova. In the series, Trixie and Katya discuss a topic humorously in front of a green screen. UNHhhh premiered on March 25, 2016, one year after Mattel and Zamolodchikova appeared in the seventh season of RuPaul's Drag Race. The show is aired through World Of Wonder's YouTube channel, as well as through its video-on-demand service WOW Presents Plus. UNHhhh has been nominated for nine Streamy Awards throughout its run, winning Unscripted Series at the 2020 ceremony, which the duo also hosted.

Production
The show began in March 2016, and aired 65 episodes before World of Wonder announced the conclusion to the show and the premiere of The Trixie & Katya Show, a television spin-off on Viceland. The Trixie & Katya Show was canceled after one season and the series returned to YouTube for its third season in October 2018. Beginning with season three, new episodes would premiere on WOW Presents Plus uncensored the week before being released on YouTube. A fourth season aired from January 16 to September 12, 2019, with a special Christmas episode on December 11, 2019.

On September 20, 2019, Trixie Mattel uploaded a video on her personal Twitter account revealing that the series would return for a fifth season, which premiered on January 22, 2020. The series then went into a brief hiatus from March to August 2020 due to the COVID-19 pandemic, with Trixie and Katya Save the World airing as a replacement series during this time. On July 22, World of Wonder released a teaser on their YouTube page saying that UNHhhh would be returning on August 5 with new episodes filmed during the pandemic and some that were filmed before but not edited. To accommodate social distancing guidelines, Trixie and Katya were seated at a distance and filmed with multiple cameras, being edited to look closer together in the final cut. The season concluded on December 30, 2020 with the hosts confirming a sixth season would be produced which premiered on WOWPresents+ on April 21, 2021. Starting with season six, episodes were released on WOW Presents Plus one month before their YouTube debut. Season seven premiered on April 20, 2022.

Format
The episodes span around 10–20 minutes in length on average and are produced in front of a green screen. Each episode covers one topic such as Beauty Tips or Colors, and features Trixie and Katya's brand of dark adult humor. The two drag queens often go on tangents in each episode, playing jokes off of one another. The use of the green screen results in edit-heavy episodes that add to the humor, with many moments or sound bites becoming memes and often quoted by fans. Each episode begins with the queens giving humorous intros, a trend started by Trixie Mattel in the second episode with "I'm market woman of the Serengeti, Trixie Mattel." The web series is heavily self-reflexive, with gags often repeating or being repeated on sister productions for Trixie and Katya, such as their podcast The Bald and the Beautiful.

Episodes

Season 1 (2016)

Season 2 (2017)

Season 3 (2018)

Season 4 (2019)
{| class="wikitable plainrowheaders mw-collapsible mw-collapsed"
|-
! style="background:#346088; color: #FFFFFF; width:10%;"| No. in series
! style="background:#346088; color: #FFFFFF; width:10%;"| No. in season
! style="background:#346088; color: #FFFFFF; width:32%;"| Title
! style="background:#346088; color: #FFFFFF; width:10%;"| Length
! style="background:#346088; color: #FFFFFF; width:18%;"| Release date
|-

|}

Season 5 (2020)

Season 6 (2021)
{| class="wikitable plainrowheaders mw-collapsible mw-collapsed"
|-
! style="background:#a6a151; color: #FFFFFF; width:10%;"| No. in series
! style="background:#a6a151; color: #FFFFFF; width:10%;"| No. in season
! style="background:#a6a151; color: #FFFFFF; width:32%;"| Title
! style="background:#a6a151; color: #FFFFFF; width:10%;"| Length
! style="background:#a6a151; color: #FFFFFF; width:18%;"| Release date
|-

|}

Season 7 (2022)

Special Episodes

Spin-offs

Trixie and Katya Save the World
Trixie and Katya Save the World was created as a replacement for UNHhhh, which was on hiatus due to the 2020 COVID-19 pandemic. Filmed in the duo's homes over videochat, the show features the queens answering questions and attempting to solve the audience member's problems, in a vein similar to the "Asking For a Friend" bit from their Viceland series. The series premiered on March 30, 2020, exclusively on WOW Presents Plus, although the eighth episode was also released on YouTube.

Reception
Vice Rachel Miller stated, "Trixie and Katya's show is actually my favorite part of all of this [RuPaul's Drag Race related fandom], and it totally stands alone; I'd recommend getting into it even if you don't watch Drag Race proper." The show was positively reviewed by Rachel Paulson of The Queer Creative podcast.

Episodes

UNHhhh, the Podcast 
During the COVID-19 filming hiatus, episodes 1–121 were uploaded in podcast format with later episodes being uploaded gradually.

The Bald and the Beautiful

On October 6, 2020 the duo premiered a new podcast called The Bald and the Beautiful. The show "feature[s] a pair of grizzled gay ghouls exploring the culture boundaries of modern beauty through interviews with gorgeous guests who inhabit various facets of the beauty industry."

Starting with episode 35, episodes were additionally released as video podcasts on the official Trixie & Katya YouTube channel. On October 26, 2021, the duo announced that the podcast would go on an extended hiatus. However, they returned the next week, confirming that they planned to finish out the year and later continued the podcast into 2022.

The show won the 2021 Queerty Award for Best Podcast (and was the runner-up the following year) and the 2022 Webby Award for Best Podcast Ad.

Episodes

Revisited episodes

Awards and nominations

Awards and nominations

Notes

 Katya was absent for this episode
 Trixie was absent for this episode

References

2016 web series debuts
American comedy web series
American LGBT-related web series
Impact of the COVID-19 pandemic on television
Streamy Award winners
WOW Presents Plus original programming